The Mexico Golden Aztecs were a professional American football team based in Monterrey, Mexico. During the team's brief existence it played in the Texas Division of the Continental Football League, and its home games were played at the Estadio Universitario. The team's only head coach was Duncan McCauley.

On July 26, 1969 the Golden Aztecs played the Chicago Owls in a preseason game that was the first professional American football game from a United States league played in Mexico. Citing a lack of fan support, team owner Red McCombs announced in September that he was pulling the then-undefeated team from Monterrey and seeking a move to Mexico City or another city that could support the team. The Golden Aztecs played their next four games on the road but could not come to an agreement with Estadio Azteca officials due to their insistence that tickets be priced at 38 cents.

The franchise's final game took place on September 18, 1969 and was a road win against the Dallas Rockets. On September 21 the franchise ceased operations and forfeited the remainder of their 1969 schedule.

Season-by-season

References

Continental Football League teams
American football teams in Mexico
Sports teams in Monterrey
American football teams established in 1969
American football teams disestablished in 1969
1969 establishments in Mexico
1969 disestablishments in Mexico